Windows tax may refer to:
 The window tax, an historic British tax on glass
 "Windows tax", a term for the cost of Microsoft Windows preinstalled on a computer; see Bundling of Microsoft Windows